Dragan Maršićanin (born 26 January 1950) is a Serbian economist and politician. He was the ambassador of Serbia to Switzerland from 2004 to 2009. He served as the Minister of Economy in 2004, only to leave it in order to run for president in 2004. He later resigned from the position and was replaced by Predrag Bubalo in October, 2004.

In the 2004 Serbian presidential election Maršićanin finished 4th with 13.3% of the vote.

He has been President of the National Assembly of Serbia in 2001 and in 2004, and the interim acting President of Serbia between 4 February and 3 March 2004.

Maršićanin graduated from the University of Belgrade Faculty of Economics. Following university studies, he worked for companies such as Elektron, Novi Kolektiv and Belgrade Water Utility Company. He has been a member of the Democratic Party of Serbia since the party's founding. For a time he was the secretary of party, and currently is its vice-president. He served as chairman of Vračar municipality in Belgrade until 1996.

See also 
List of Ambassadors from Serbia

References 

1950 births
Living people
Politicians from Belgrade
Presidents of the National Assembly (Serbia)
Democratic Party of Serbia politicians
Ambassadors of Serbia to Switzerland
Presidents of Serbia within Yugoslavia
University of Belgrade Faculty of Economics alumni
Candidates for President of Serbia
Diplomats from Belgrade
New Democratic Party of Serbia politicians